Rich Herrin (April 6, 1933 – December 25, 2020) was a top collegiate basketball coach in America. From 2012 to 2014, he coached collegiately at Morthland College, as well as the Southern Illinois University Salukis men's basketball team from 1985 to 1998. He was one of the most successful high school basketball coaches in Illinois history, at Benton High School (Rangers), where he coached numerous renowned players, including former NBA and Olympic star, Doug Collins, Saint Louis University Walk-On Legend "Jumpin" Joe Durham, as well as former Georgia Tech great, Richard Yunkus. After SIU, he coached at Marion for some time before retiring in 2007.

He returned to coaching again in 2012 to start up the Morthland College men's basketball program.

Herrin was the son of a Methodist minister in Bridgeport, Illinois. He played high school basketball on multiple weeknights except Wednesdays, the evening many Christian churches hold midweek services. Rich won 7 varsity letters in high school and 11 letters at McKendree College in Lebanon.

Rich had four undefeated teams in regular season play – 1966, 1967, 1971 and 1975.  His Benton teams won 8 South Seven conference championships and finished second twice. Three Ranger teams advanced to the Elite 8 and four others lost in a photo finish.

Herrin died on December 25, 2020, at age 87.

College head coaching record

References

1933 births
2020 deaths
American men's basketball coaches
American men's basketball players
High school basketball coaches in the United States
McKendree Bearcats men's basketball players
Southern Illinois Salukis men's basketball coaches